Cutter Wentworth is a fictional character on the ABC daytime soap opera One Life to Live. He was portrayed by Josh Kelly from December 29, 2010 to December 29, 2011. Kelly reprised the role when new daily episodes of OLTL began airing on Hulu via The Online Network from April 29, 2013 to August 19, 2013, until the show (along with All My Children) were both put on indefinite hiatus due to Prospect Park's lawsuit against ABC.

Casting

Kelly was originally cast in the long-time role of Joey Buchanan, a character that was returning to the show as a permanent contract role after six years. However, producers later decided that Kelly was a better fit for the newly created character Cutter, who, like Joey, would also serve as a love interest for both Terri Conn's Aubrey Wentworth and Gina Tognoni's Kelly Cramer. The role of Joey would be taken by Tom Degnan.

References

External links
Soap's Cutter Wentworth
Cutter Wentworth profile – SoapCentral.com

Television characters introduced in 2010
One Life to Live characters
Fictional con artists
Male characters in television
Fictional criminals in soap operas